A frame drum is a drum that has a drumhead width greater than its depth. It is one of the most ancient musical instruments, and perhaps the first drum to be invented. It has a single drumhead that is usually made of rawhide, but man-made materials may also be used. Some frame drums have mechanical tuning, while on many others the drumhead is tacked in place. The drumhead is stretched over a round, wooden frame called a shell. The shell is traditionally constructed of rosewood, oak, ash etc. that has been bent and then scarf jointed together; though some are also made of plywood or man-made materials. Metal rings or jingles may also be attached to the frame.  In many cultures larger frame drums are played mainly by men in spiritual ceremonies, while medium-size drums are played mainly by women.

Types of frame drums

References

 Liene Žeimunde (June 17, 2020) Step by step: leather drum. Public Broadcasting of Latvia

Drums
Medicine drums
Directly struck membranophones